EWAY is a bus rapid transit route being built in Northern Ireland to link the town of Dundonald in County Down with Belfast City Centre.

Belfast Rapid Transit
EWAY is the eastern arm of the planned Belfast Rapid Transit network of three bus rapid transit routes for the city. The western arm is the  WWAY to Dunmurry in County Antrim, which is also now being built.

The Belfast Rapid Transit plan includes also a short northeastern arm, the  CITI route to the Catalyst Inc via the Titanic Quarter, and a shared  city centre loop to link all three routes. Building of the CITI route and central loop has yet to begin.

EWAY history and route
In January 2007 David Cairns MP, then Regional Development Minister of Northern Ireland, announced that engineering consultants WS Atkins PLC were to undertake economic feasibility studies on rapid transit proposals for Belfast, including 
assessing the Belfast Metropolitan Transport Plan (BMTP) proposals for the EWAY rapid transit scheme which would run between Dundonald and Belfast city centre. A report was expected around mid-2007.

Both the Regional Transportation Strategy (RTS) for Northern Ireland and the BMTP recognised the value of introducing rapid transit services in Belfast. At first both light rail and bus rapid transit were considered as options. Light rail was eliminated on cost grounds, and the entire Belfast Rapid Transit project is now planned as bus rapid transit.

Originally much of the EWAY was to be routed along the trackbed of what had been the main line of the Belfast and County Down Railway (BCDR) between the site of Ballymacarrett Junction in East Belfast and the former Dundonald railway station in County Down. In 2003–04 the Knock Valley Relief Sewer was laid along  of the former BCDR trackbed, flowing from Dundonald to Ballymacarrett. The sewer is aligned so as not to jeopardise EWAY's then-proposed use of the trackbed.

However, the trackbed had already been re-used to create the Comber Greenway pedestrian and cycle route. A campaign group called "Greenway to Stay" was formed to lobby for EWAY to be re-routed along Upper Newtownards Road. In October 2011 it was announced that EWAY would not include the Comber Greenway in its route.

See also
List of bus rapid transit systems

References

External links

Bus rapid transit
Bus transport in Northern Ireland
Transport in Belfast